Azerbaijan competed at the 2020 Winter Youth Olympics in Lausanne, Switzerland from 9 to 22 January 2020. This was also the first time that Azerbaijan qualified to compete at the Winter Youth Olympic Games. 

Azerbaijan made it Winter Youth Olympics debut.

Figure skating

Two Azerbaijanis figure skaters achieved quota places for Azerbaijan based on the results of the 2019 World Junior Figure Skating Championships.

Singles

See also
Azerbaijan at the 2020 Summer Olympics

References

2020 in Azerbaijani sport
Nations at the 2020 Winter Youth Olympics
Azerbaijan at the Youth Olympics